Andrew Kuder (1838 - April 30, 1899) was an American soldier who fought in the American Civil War. Kuder received his country's highest award for bravery during combat, the Medal of Honor. Kuder's medal was won for capturing the flag during the Battle of Waynesboro on March 2, 1865. He was honored with the award on March 26, 1865.

Kuder was born in Groveland, New York, entered service in Rochester, and was buried in Conesus, New York.

Medal of Honor citation

See also
List of American Civil War Medal of Honor recipients: G–L

References

1838 births
1899 deaths
American Civil War recipients of the Medal of Honor
People of New York (state) in the American Civil War
Union Army officers
United States Army Medal of Honor recipients
People from Groveland, New York